Khamaungtaw is a village in Ann Township, Kyaukpyu District, in northern Rakhine State in the westernmost part of Burma (Myanmar). It is northwest of Ann on the Ann - Minbya highway. Khamaungtaw is southeast of Dalet.

Notes

External links
"Khamaungtaw Map — Satellite Images of Khamaungtaw" Maplandia

Populated places in Kyaukpyu District
Ann Township